Francisco ("Kiko") Fábregas Monegal (born 14 October 1977 in Barcelona, Catalonia) is a field hockey midfielder from Spain, who finished in fourth position with the Men's National Team at the 2004 Summer Olympics in Athens, Greece. Four years earlier, in Sydney, he ended up in ninth place with the national side. Fábregas plays club hockey for Real Club de Polo in his hometown of Barcelona.

References
 Spanish Olympic Committee

External links

1977 births
Living people
Spanish male field hockey players
Male field hockey midfielders
Olympic field hockey players of Spain
Field hockey players at the 2000 Summer Olympics
Field hockey players at the 2004 Summer Olympics
Field hockey players at the 2008 Summer Olympics
1998 Men's Hockey World Cup players
2002 Men's Hockey World Cup players
2006 Men's Hockey World Cup players
Olympic silver medalists for Spain
Field hockey players from Barcelona
Medalists at the 2008 Summer Olympics
Real Club de Polo de Barcelona players
Olympic medalists in field hockey